The 1969 NCAA University Division Swimming and Diving Championships were contested in March 1969 at Royer Pool at Indiana University in Bloomington, Indiana at the 46th annual NCAA-sanctioned swim meet to determine the team and individual national champions of University Division men's collegiate swimming and diving in the United States.

Hosts Indiana once again topped the team standings, the Hoosiers' second title in program history.

Team standings
Note: Top 10 only
(H) = Hosts
Full results

See also
List of college swimming and diving teams

References

NCAA Division I Men's Swimming and Diving Championships
NCAA University Division Swimming And Diving Championships
NCAA University Division Swimming And Diving Championships
NCAA University Division Swimming And Diving Championships